Agdistis picardi is a moth in the family Pterophoridae. It is known from Madagascar.

References

Agdistinae
Moths of Madagascar
Moths of Africa
Moths described in 1964